William Joseph Hoffman (March 3, 1918 – May 14, 2004) was a professional baseball player. He pitched in three games for the Philadelphia Phillies in August 1939.

References

External links

Baseball Almanac

Major League Baseball pitchers
Philadelphia Phillies players
Baseball players from Pennsylvania
1918 births
2004 deaths